Mark Fellows (nicknamed "The Iceman") 
(5 September 1980) is an English hitman convicted of the murders of John Kinsella and Paul Massey, rival enforcers to the Anti A Team criminal network. At the time of his conviction he was one of only 70 prisoners sentenced to a whole life term.

Background
Fellows lived in Warrington but was originally from Salford.

Murders

Paul Massey murder
On 26 July 2015, Massey was shot dead outside his home on Manchester Road, Clifton, by a lone gunman. The killer was reported to have been wearing military style fatigues and carried a weapon "similar to a sub machine gun". Greater Manchester Police offered a £50,000 reward for information pertaining to the killing.

John Kinsella murder
Kinsella was shot dead on 5 May 2018 near St Helens Linkway in Rainhill as he walked with his pregnant partner Wendy Owen. The killers used encrypted EncroChat handsets to co-ordinate the murder.

Trial
The trial lasted eight weeks, with heavily armed police officers in attendance. His fellow criminal Steven Boyle was also on trial. Boyle was described as Fellows' "brother in arms" and accused of acting as a spotter, watching the victims and providing assistance to the gunman.

During the trial, evidence from a Garmin fitness watch with a GPS function found in Fellows' house was used to show that he had travelled from his home to a field opposite Massey's home.

Conviction
Fellows was found guilty of the murders of both Massey and Kinsella, but found not guilty of the attempted murder of Owen. Mr Justice William Davis sentenced him to a whole-life term. Boyle was convicted of the murder of Kinsella, but cleared of the murder of Massey and the attempted murder of Owen.

Assault in prison
In February 2019 Fellows was seriously injured when he was slashed by another prisoner with a weapon believed to have been made from a razor blade. He was attacked in HM Prison Whitemoor and airlifted to hospital.

Appeal of sentence
He appealed against his sentence on the grounds that it was "excessive", but in July 2019 the appeal was turned down.

2020 attempted murder trial

In October 2020 Fellows went on trial accused of attempting to murder Abduhl Khan and Aaron Williams, associates of Paul Massey. In 2015, there were a number of incidents as a result of a dispute between two Salford organised crime groups who called themselves the 'A Team' and 'Anti-A Team'. The incidents were all investigated as part of 'Operation Leopard', led by detectives from GMP's Major Incident Team.

These sentences are the culmination of Operation Leopard: Phase Three. Under phases One and Two, 11 members of organised crime groups were jailed in connection with linked incidents including the murders of Paul Massey and John Kinsella and the shootings of seven-year-old Christian Hickey Junior and his mother, Jayne.

The first incident investigated as part of Operation Leopard: Phase Three happened on 18 February 2015 on Doveleys Road. Three men were in a parked car when three shots were fired – at point blank range – into the driver's door. Police later found a hidden tracker on the Mercedes.

The second happened on 21 March 2015 on Brattice Drive. Two other men were near one of their cars when they were attacked with a machete and a baseball bat. One of them was seriously injured and could have been killed if it was not for an off duty nurse who administered first aid. Police later found a hidden tracker on the Volkswagen.

The jury was told how both incidents were planned ambushes of members of the A Team by members of the Anti-A Team. Key to the investigations were the forensic examinations of the trackers found on the vehicles – the DNA of Aaron Parkin, of HMP Manchester, was found on one of the devices. Telephone analysis also linked Parkin to the purchase, deployment and monitoring of both devices.

CCTV from Parkin's home showed Mark Fellows, of HMP Wakefield, was there when a tracker was monitored in the lead-up to one of the incidents.

Following a six-week trial, a jury found Fellows guilty of conspiracy to cause grievous bodily harm in connection with the second incident. Parkin previously pleaded guilty to two counts of conspiracy to cause grievous bodily harm in connection with both incidents.

On 13 November 2020 a judge at Manchester Crown Court sentenced Fellows to life with a minimum term of nine years and Parkin to 14 years.

References

Prisoners sentenced to life imprisonment by England and Wales
20th-century English criminals
21st-century English criminals
English people convicted of murder
English male criminals
People from Salford
Living people
1980 births